Basic salivary proline-rich protein 4 is a protein that in humans is encoded by the PRB4 gene.

The protein encoded by this gene is a proline-rich salivary protein. This gene and five other genes that also encode salivary proline-rich proteins (PRPs), as well as a gene encoding a lacrimal gland PRP, form a PRP gene cluster in the chromosomal 12p13 region.

PRB4 is post-translationally cleaved into three different mature peptides:
Protein N1
Glycosylated protein A
Peptide P-D (also known as proline-rich peptide IB-5)

References

Further reading

Precursor proteins
Salivary proline-rich proteins